Climate migration is a subset of climate-related mobility that refers to primarily voluntary movement driven by the impact of sudden or gradual climate-exacerbated disasters, such as “abnormally heavy rainfalls, prolonged droughts, desertification, environmental degradation, or sea-level rise and cyclones.” The majority of climate migrants move internally within their own countries, though a smaller number of climate-displaced people also move across national borders.

Climate change gives rise to migration on a large, global scale. The United Nations High Commissioner for Refugees (UNHCR) estimates that an average of 20 million people are forcibly displaced to other areas in countries all over the world by weather-related events every year. Climate-related disasters disproportionately affect marginalized populations, who are often facing other structural challenges in climate-vulnerable regions and countries. As a result, climate-related disasters are often described as a threat multiplier that compounds crises over time and space. The 2021 White House Report on the Impact of Climate Change on Migration underscored the multifaceted impacts of climate change and climate-related migration, ranging from destabilizing vulnerable and marginalized communities, exacerbating resource scarcity, to igniting political tension.

Few existing international frameworks and regional and domestic legal regimes provide adequate protection to climate migrants. However, as the UN Dispatch noted, "people who have been uprooted because of climate change exist all over the world — even if the international community has been slow to recognize them as such." As a result, climate migration has been described as “the world’s silent crisis,” contrasting its global pervasiveness with its lack of recognition and investigation. The number of people displaced by climate-related disasters is forecast to top 200 million by 2050. The World Bank projects that there will be 216 million climate migrants by 2050. The IEP projects there will be 1.2 billion climate migrants by 2050. The UN International Organization for Migration projects that there will be 1.4 billion climate migrants by 2060.

Definitions 
Climate migrants refer to those who engage in primarily voluntary movement driven by the impact of sudden or gradual climate change, such as “abnormally heavy rainfalls, prolonged droughts, desertification, environmental degradation, or sea-level rise and cyclones.”

Few existing international frameworks and regional and domestic legal regimes provide adequate protection to climate migrants. Typically, climate migrants are not legally recognized as refugees and therefore do not enjoy international and domestic refugee law protections. For example, in the Americas, instead of being granted refugee status, individuals displaced by environmental factors are offered humanitarian visas or complementary protection, which do not always provide permanent residence and citizenship pathways. Internationally, the 1951 Refugee Convention does not recognize climate factors as a standalone criteria to define a refugee. However, in January 2020, the UN Human Rights Committee ruled that "climate refugees fleeing the effects of the climate crisis cannot be forced by their adoptive countries to return to their home counties whose climate is posing an immediate threat."

Climate justice and adaptation 

Climate migrants may migrate internally within their own country or to another country in response to climate change. However, climate adaptation projects in preparation for and in response to climate change may increase the climate resilience of communities and reduce the degree of migration people will need to make in the face of climate change.

There are both short- and long-term impacts of climate change which bring under-prepared communities environmental harm and exacerbate existing inequities. In the short-term, sudden climatic events like severe storms and natural disasters may destroy critical infrastructure, flood neighborhoods, disrupt transit systems, overburden medical centers, cause food and water shortages, destabilize energy plants, and jeopardize human health and well-being. In the long-term, famines, droughts, and other resource shortages and economic damages brought about by climate change may cause conflict, political instability, climate gentrification, and accumulated negative health effects due to exposure to unhealthy environments. Just as individuals and countries do not contribute equally to climate change, they also do not experience the negative effects of the crisis equally.

The degree to which some of the environmental and related changes occur can be reduced by means of climate adaptation projects which increase the climate resilience of communities and peoples. Varying levels of investment are made in supporting the adaptation, resilience, and mobility of neighborhoods, municipalities, and nations in the face of climate change and consequent environmental migration. Small island states, rural populations, people of color, low-income communities, the elderly, people with disabilities, coastal urban populations, food and housing insecure households, and least developed countries are especially vulnerable to the worst effects of the climate crisis and therefore to environmental migration. People with livelihoods tied to the environment, like those in agriculture, fisheries, and coast-dependent businesses, are also at risk of relocation or job loss due to climate change. Who leaves and who stays when affected by climate change often falls along lines of race and class, as mobility requires some amount of wealth.

Global statistics 
In 1990, the Intergovernmental Panel on Climate Change (IPCC 1990: 20) declared that the greatest single consequence of climate change could be migration, 'with millions of people displaced by shoreline erosion, coastal flooding and severe drought'.

The most common projection is that the world will have 150–200 million people displaced by climate change by 2050. Variations of this claim have been made in influential reports on climate change by the IPCC (Brown 2008: 11) and the Stern Review on the Economics of Climate Change (Stern et al. 2006: 3), as well as by NGOs such as Friends of the Earth, Greenpeace Germany (Jakobeit and Methmann 2007) and Christian Aid; and inter-governmental organisations such as the Council of Europe, UNESCO, IOM (Brown 2008) and UNHCR.

Francois Gemenne has stated that: 'When it comes to predictions, figures are usually based on the number of people living in regions at risk, and not on the number of people actually expected to migrate. Estimates do not account for adaptation strategies [or] different levels of vulnerability' (Gemenne 2009: 159). However, Hein de Haas has argued that to link the climate change issue "with the specter of mass migration is a dangerous practice based on myth rather than fact. The use of apocalyptic migration forecasts to support the case for urgent action on climate change is not only intellectually dishonest, but also puts the credibility of those using this argument - as well as the broader case for climate change action - seriously at risk". He argued that while "climate change is unlikely to cause mass migration" this also overlooks the fact that the implications of environmental adversity are most severe for the most vulnerable populations who lack the means to move out

While climate-related migration is often framed as a remote issue, extreme weather events are already forcing people out of their homes in many parts of the world. In 2020, storms, floods, landslides, wildfires and droughts triggered 38 million internal displacements (i.e. displacement within a country), according to the Internal Displacement Monitoring Centre. This is a record and three times as many forced movements as those caused by conflicts.

In 2018, the BBC reported that "UN figures indicate that 80% of people displaced by climate change are women".

Statistics by region

Asia and the Pacific 

According to the Internal Displacement Monitoring Centre, more than 42 million people were displaced in Asia and the Pacific triggered by sudden onset natural hazards during 2010 and 2011, more than twice the population of Sri Lanka. This figure includes those displaced by storms, floods, and heat and cold waves. Still others were displaced by drought and sea-level rise. Most of those compelled to leave their homes eventually returned when conditions improved, but an undetermined number became migrants, usually within their country, but also across national borders.

Climate-induced migration is a highly complex issue which needs to be understood as part of global migration dynamics. Migration typically has multiple causes, and environmental factors are intertwined with other social and economic factors, which themselves can be influenced by environmental changes. The United Nations High Commissioner for Refugees (UNHCR) recognized that climate change and environmental harm frequently “interact[] with other drivers of displacement” that fit into the established refugee definition. A 2012 Asian Development Bank study argues that climate-induced migration should be addressed as part of a country's development agenda, given the major implications of migration on economic and social development. The report recommends interventions both to address the situation of those who have migrated, as well as those who remain in areas subject to environmental risk. It says: "To reduce migration compelled by worsening environmental conditions, and to strengthen the resilience of at-risk communities, governments should adopt policies and commit financing to social protection, livelihoods development, basic urban infrastructure development, and disaster risk management."

Additionally, it is maintained that the poor populate areas that are most at risk for environmental destruction and climate change, including coastlines, flood-lines, and steep slopes. As a result, climate change threatens areas already suffering from extreme poverty. "The issue of equity is crucial. Climate affects us all, but does not affect us all equally," UN Secretary-General Ban Ki-moon told delegates at a climate conference in Indonesia. Africa is also one of the world regions where environmental displacement is critical largely due to droughts and other climate-related eventualities.

Due to rising sea levels, as many as 70,000 people will be displaced in the Sundarbans as early as 2020 according to an estimate by the Center for Oceanographic Studies at Jadavpur University. One expert calls for restoring the Sundarbans’ original mangrove habitats to both mitigate the impacts of rising seas and storm surges, and to serve as a carbon sink for greenhouse gas emissions.

650 families of Satbhaya in Kendrapara district of Odisha, India who have been displaced by sea level rise and coastal erosion have been a part of the state government of Odisha's pioneering approach to planned relocation at Bagapatia under Gupti Panchayat. While this approach makes provision for homestead land and other amenities, provisioning for livelihoods like agriculture and fishing which are the mainstay for the relocated populations is needed.

In Minqin County, Gansu Province, "10,000 people have left the area and have become shengtai yimin, 'ecological migrants'". In Xihaigu, Ningxia, water shortages driven by climate change and deforestation have resulted in several waves of government-mandated relocations since 1983.

In 2013 a claim of a Kiribati man, Ioane Teitiota, of being a "climate change refugee" under the Convention relating to the Status of Refugees (1951) was determined by the New Zealand High Court to be untenable. The Refugee Convention did not apply as there is no persecution or serious harm related to any of the five stipulated convention grounds. The Court rejected the argument that the international community itself (or countries which can be said to have been historically high emitters of carbon dioxide or other greenhouse gases) were the "persecutor" for the purposes of the Refugee Convention. This analysis of the need for the person to identify persecution of the type described in the Refugee Convention does not exclude the possibility that a people for countries experiencing severe impacts of climate change can come with the Refugee Convention. However, it is not the climate change event itself, rather the social and political response to climate change, which is likely to create the pathway for a successful claim. The New Zealand Immigration and Protection Tribunal and the High Court, "there is a complex inter-relationship between natural disasters, environmental degradation and human vulnerability. Sometimes a tenable pathway to international protection under the Refugee Convention can result. Environmental issues sometimes lead to armed conflict. There may be ensuing violence towards or direct repression of an entire section of a population. Humanitarian relief can become politicised, particularly in situations where some group inside a disadvantaged country is the target of direct discrimination". The New Zealand Court of Appeal also rejected the claim in a 2014 decision. On further appeal, the New Zealand Supreme Court confirmed the earlier adverse rulings against the application for refugee status, with the Supreme Court also rejecting the proposition "that environmental degradation resulting from climate change or other natural disasters could never create a pathway into the Refugee Convention or protected person jurisdiction". Teitiota appealed to the UN. In January 2020, the UN Human Rights Committee "ruled against Teitiota on the basis that his life was not at imminent risk," but also said that it was a human rights violation to force refugees to return "to countries where climate change poses an immediate threat."

In 2014 attention was drawn to an appeal to the New Zealand Immigration and Protection Tribunal against the deportation of a Tuvaluan family on the basis that they were "climate change refugees", who would suffer hardship resulting from the environmental degradation of Tuvalu. However the subsequent grant of residence permits to the family was made on grounds unrelated to the refugee claim. The family was successful in their appeal because, under the relevant immigration legislation, there were "exceptional circumstances of a humanitarian nature" that justified the grant of resident permits as the family was integrated into New Zealand society with a sizeable extended family which had effectively relocated to New Zealand.

North America

California 
California is confronting a growing forest and wildlife crisis due to wildfire. California has historically been vulnerable to wildfires – at least a third of the worst wildfires in US history have occurred in California. However, climate change – specifically, warmer temperatures and more intense drought seasons – in recent years have dramatically increased the size and intensity of wildfires in the state. More than half of the 20 largest California wildfires in modern history occurred between 2018 and 2022. The 2020 wildfires were particularly devastating, burning down more than 4 million acres of land, destroying thousands of buildings, and forcing hundreds of thousands of people to leave their homes.

Evidence suggests that only a small percentage of those affected by the wildfires choose to stay. Only several thousands of the 27,000 residents affected by the 2018 Sierra Nevada fire chose to remain and rebuild. The others chose to migrate either to other parts of California or out-of-state. They face special difficulties with relocation due to lack of fire insurance policies and the state’s lack of affordable housing. The state estimates at least 2.5 million homes are needed in the next eight years to catch up to demand.

Alaska 

There have been 178 Alaskan communities threatened by erosion of their land. The annual temperature has steadily increased over the last fifty years, with Alaska seeing it double (compared to the rate seen across the rest of the United States) to the rate of 3.4 degrees, with an alarming 6.3 degrees increase for the winters over the past fifty years. Many of the communities residing in these areas have been living off the land for generations. There is an eminent threat of loss of culture and loss of tribal identity with these communities.

Between 2003 and 2009, a partial survey by the Army Corps of Engineers identified thirty-one Alaskan villages under imminent threat of flooding and erosion. By 2009, 12 of the 31 villages had decided to relocate, with four (Kivalina, Newtok, Shaktoolik, and Shishmaref) requiring immediate evacuation due to danger of immediate flooding along with limited evacuation options.

However, relocation is proving difficult because there is no governmental institutional framework that exists for the aid of climate refugees in the United States. The Obama administration promised to fund $50.4 billion to help with relocation efforts in 2016.

Louisiana 
Isle de Jean Charles, Louisiana, home to the Biloxi-Chitimacha-Choctaw First Nation, is being depopulated with federal grant money, due to saltwater intrusion and sea level rise. This Indigenous Nation residing on the Isle de Jean Charles is facing the effects of climate change. The resettlement of this community of around 100, exists as the first migration of a total community in the state of Louisiana. In early 2016, a 48-million-dollar grant was the first allocation of federal tax dollars to aid a community suffering from direct impact of climate change. Louisiana has lost land mass comparable to the size of the state of Delaware revealing land mass loss that is at a rate faster than many places in the world. The resettlement plan for the Isle de Jean Charles is at the forefront of responding to climate change without destroying the community that resides within.

Washington state 

Native American tribes located on the outer coast of the state of Washington’s Olympic Peninsula, such as the Quinault Indian Nation village of Taholah, and the Shoalwater Bay Tribe, have been increasingly vulnerable to encroaching sea levels, storm surges and intense rain causing landslides and floods. In response, the Quinault Indian Nation conducted a vulnerability assessment and devised a comprehensive relocation plan to move two of its villages – Taholah and Queets, home to 660 tribal members – to higher ground way above the tsunami and flood zones. However, relocation is expensive and only possible with federal funding – it is estimated that moving the 471-member Shoalwater Bay Tribe up the mountain could cost half a billion dollars. The Department of the Interior, under the Biden Administration, has created programs designed to help relocate communities affected by climate change and is assessing which tribes to allocate funding to first.

Central America and the Caribbean 

The people of Central America and the Caribbean are repeatedly faced with severe weather events and climate change will only exacerbate this issue. A large portion of this region lies along the “Dry Corridor”, an arid region that includes areas of Panama, Honduras, Nicaragua, El Salvador and the Dominican Republic. The dry corridor is predicted to expand with the onset of climate change. It is currently home to approximately 10 million people, half of whom are subsistence farmers. From 2009 - 2019, two million residents in the dry corridor have experienced hunger because of extreme weather events caused by climate change. Natural weather patterns such as the El Niño Southern Oscillation, or simply “El Niño”, can make dry conditions in this region more extreme. Wet periods following an El Niño weather event can bring torrential rain that results in major flooding and catastrophic landslides. Multiple studies have shown that climate change could result in more frequent extreme El Niños.

Food security issues are expected to worsen across Central America due to climate change. In August 2019, Honduras declared a state of emergency when a drought caused the southern part of the country to lose 72% of its corn and 75% of its bean production. It is predicted that by 2070, corn yields in Central America may fall by 10%, beans by 29%, and rice by 14%. With Central American crop consumption dominated by corn (70%), beans (25%), and rice (6%), the expected drop in staple crop yields could have devastating consequences. The World Bank predicts that by 2050, climate change-induced migration could displace 1.4 - 2.1 million residents of Central America and Mexico. The highest estimate is that worsening droughts and flooding from climate change could displace up to 4 million people in the region by 2050.

Several weather events in the 21st century have displayed the devastating effects of the El Niño weather pattern and have led to mass displacement and hunger crises. In 2009, extreme drought hit the Dry Corridor, followed by Hurricane Ida. The storm affected forty thousand people in Nicaragua and left thirteen thousand homeless. In 2015, due to the strongest El Niño in recorded history, hundreds of thousands of Central American subsistence farmers lost a portion or the entirety of their crops. Throughout 2014 and 2015, El Salvador alone saw over $100 million in damage to crops. In Guatemala, the drought caused a food shortage that left 3 million people struggling to feed themselves, according to a 2015 report authored by the International Organization for Migration (IOM) and the United Nations’ World Food Programme (WFP). The Guatemalan government declared a state of emergency as the drought and high food prices led to a hunger crisis during which chronic malnutrition was common among children. By the end of June 2016, it was estimated by the United Nations’ Office for the Coordination of Humanitarian Affairs (OCHA) that 3.5 million people required humanitarian assistance across El Salvador, Guatemala and Honduras.

The western highlands of Guatemala are particularly susceptible to climate change, affecting the region’s predominantly Indigenous population of subsistence farmers. The main crops, potatoes and maize, have been under increasing pressure as hard frosts in the region have become more frequent since 2013. Hard frosts can kill a whole season’s worth of crops at once. At lower elevations, new pests are becoming more prevalent and there has been decreased rainfall. In 2018, 50% of the 94,000 Guatemalans deported from the United States and Mexico were from these western highlands.

The IOM/WFP report also showed the ways in which food insecurity led to migration from El Salvador, Guatemala, and Honduras. Pointing out that there are millions of Central Americans living abroad (with over 80% in the United States), the report stated there is a positive correlation between food insecurity and migration from these countries. It also confirmed that crises related to hunger and violence are exacerbated when the region heads into the second consecutive year of an extreme drought. In their conclusions, the authors definitively found that food insecurity has led to migration in these countries. Despite this evidence, the ramifications of extreme weather and climate change have rarely been discussed in relation to Central American migrants and it requires more research to prove their direct link.

South America 

Many peer-reviewed articles analyzing migration in South America have found multiple types of linkages between climate change and its effect on migration. The effects and results vary based on the type of climatic change, socioeconomic status and demographic characteristics of migrants and the distance and direction of the migration. Since most climate migration studies are done in the developed world, scientists have called for more quantitative research within the developing world, including South America. Migration in South America does not always increase as a result of increased environmental threats but is affected by factors such as climate variability and land suitability. These migrations happen either gradually or suddenly but are typically directed from rural to urban areas.  Inter-provincial migration is shown to not be as heavily influenced by environmental changes whereas migration outside of the country of origin is heavily influenced by environmental changes. The results of a climactic event catalyzing migration change depending on the onset of the event, however, climate change related events such as drought and hurricanes augment or increase youth migration. Youth are more likely to migrate as a response to climate-related events. As a result, children who have been displaced are found to travel shorter distances to find work in rural destinations versus further to an urban area. Researchers suggest a review of the terms that define who is an environmental migrant since policy-making bodies and intergovernmental agencies most affect responses when an environmental event causes people to migrate. Because of the increase in interest in this topic in the past decade some people call for a measure called preventive resettlement. The cases in which preventive resettlement appear appropriate is typically discerned by local and governmental bodies. Others call for an increase in social programs to both prevent and help in a migration event.

Active sea-level rise resulted in the relocation of the people of Enseada da Baleia, a coastal community located on Cardoso Island in southeastern Brazil. The government offered the residents the ability to either relocate to another community on the island or a city on the mainland. Most residents chose to move to a new location that was more inland on the same island and paid for their own expenses of relocation with little government assistance. Brazilian lawyer Erika Pires Ramos argues that the dilemma faced by the residents of Enseada da Baleia illustrates how climate migrants are invisible throughout much of Latin America. Governments must first recognize and identify groups of climate migrants in order to better help them. 

The International Organization for Migration estimates that today nearly 11 million South Americans are currently resettling or migrating due to recent and ongoing natural disasters, some of which are climate-induced. Collecting and maintaining data on climate migrants remains a major obstacle for South American governments in preparing and anticipating for migration flows from future climate-induced disasters. Peru passed a national climate change law in 2018 that mandates the government, led by a multi-agency group, to create a plan to mitigate and adapt to future climate migrations. Uruguay already has its own “national resettlement plan” for climate-induced migrations in place. 

A few countries like Argentina and Brazil, offer a “disaster-related emergency visa”. In Argentina, the visa came into effect in 2022 includes relocation, housing and integration support provided by civil society.

Some Kuna people, such as those in the settlement of Gardi Sugdub, have decided to relocate from islands to the mainland of Panama due to sea level rise.

Europe 

Estimates put the number of displaced persons in Europe from climate-related events at over 700,000 in the last ten years. Most of the continent’s climate-related catastrophes are a result of either flooding or wildfires.

The European Union has yet to adopt any continent-wide convention on the status of migrants displaced by climate-related events.

Record droughts caused by climate change in part of the Middle East are increasingly seen as a significant contributing factor to regional unrest and mass migrations to Europe.  While the role of climate change in exacerbating internal domestic unrest is still being widely debated, there’s increasing empirical support for the argument that climate change acts as a security threat multiplier in developing countries. Back-to-back unprecedented droughts plagued Syrian farmers from 2006 to 2011, resulting in mass migrations from the countryside to the cities where existing infrastructure came under strain. This internal migration further exacerbated the growing unemployment and inequality and was one of the main driving forces leading to the Syrian Civil War. Over one million Syrians have fled the country since the war began, largely resettling in neighboring Turkey. 

Due to the 2014 Balkan flooding (which is considered to be linked to climate change), some people in Bosnia and Herzegovina migrated to other European countries.

Moldova, with a large rural population dependent on subsistence farming, is one of Europe’s most vulnerable countries to the threat of climate change. Increasing erratic weather patterns may lead to crop failures and mass migrations to neighboring countries. In 2010, devastating floods completely submerged the village of Cotul Morii in central Moldova resulting in the evacuation of 440 families. Government authorities mandated that Cotul Morii be reconstructed in a new location 15 kilometers away from the original village which the government officially abandoned. Despite this, over 60 families chose to remain and rebuild their community in the original village even with a lack of running water or electricity. Climate migration researchers emphasize the growing importance of a “right to voluntary immobility”. There are often very sensitive and complicated issues at play when making the decision to relocate an entire population from their home, and many residents may choose to voluntarily opt-out of government efforts.

In Wales, the village of Fairbourne has been cited as an area particularly vulnerable to sea level rise. The local Gwynedd Council has described it as impractical to protect from rising sea levels and proposed managed retreat.

Political and legal perspectives 

The International Organization for Migration (IOM) expects the scale of global migration to rise as a result of accelerated climate change. It, therefore, recommends policymakers around the world to take a proactive stance on the matter. Despite the scale of climate migration, current legal protections across the world are ineffective in protecting climate migrants. A report from the International Refugee Assistance Project (IRAP) therefore recommends the creation of new legal pathways to safety for people moving in the context of climate change and environmental degradation. IRAP’s report also recommends that governments develop stronger humanitarian protection for people who are forcibly displaced in a changing climate. The report emphasizes that strengthening the legal protections for climate-displaced persons should be preemptive with increased options for these persons before environmental disasters occur.

The International Law Commission (ILC) provides guidance on the legal protections that climate-displaced persons should enjoy when disasters strikes. ILC’s Draft Articles on the Protection of Persons in the Event of Disasters advocates for mass displacement to be included in the definition of “disaster”. The United Nations Human Rights Committee (UNHRC) recently decided cases wherein the Committee asserted that “the ICCPR obligates states not to return people fleeing life-threatening climate change impacts.” In one of these cases, Teitota v. New Zealand, the UNHRC held that “individuals and groups who have crossed national borders could file subsequent petitions against deportation to the UNHRC, after exhausting domestic options, based on climate change impacts that violate the right to life.”

The Environmental Justice Foundation (EJF)  argued that people who will be forced to move due to climate change currently have no adequate recognition in international law. The EJF contends that a new multilateral legal instrument is required to specifically address the needs of "climate refugees" in order to confer protection to those fleeing environmental degradation and climate change. They have also asserted that additional funding is needed to enable developing countries to adapt to climate change. Sujatha Byravan and Sudhir Chella Rajan have argued for the use of the term 'climate exiles' and for international agreements to provide them political and legal rights, including citizenship in other countries, bearing in mind those countries' responsibilities and capabilities.

Global perceptions from possible countries of asylum 
Acceptance of the possibility of environmental migrants may be influenced by other challenges that confront a nation. For example, while India says that its India-Bangladesh barrier is intended to deter drug trade, the barrier may also deter millions of Bangladeshis who may be displaced by future climate change. In Canada, there is public interest in policies that foster planning and accommodations. On 20 September 2016, Prime Minister Trudeau of Canada told the UN Summit for Refugees and Migrants that plans just for resettlement would not be enough. Sweden which had allowed refugees to seek asylum from areas of war in an open door policy has changed to a policy that is more deterrent of asylum seekers and is even offering money for asylum seekers to withdraw their requests. The United States, which was warned under the Obama administration to prepare for climate change and consequent refugees, had more difficulties in doing so under former President Donald Trump, who denied the reality of climate change, signed executive orders dismantling environmental protections, ordered the EPA to remove climate change information from their public site, and signaled his administration's unwillingness to anticipate environmental refugees from climate change.

A nation grants "asylum" when it grants someone freedom from prosecution within its borders. Each country makes its own rules and laws of asylum. The United States, for example, has a system recognized by federal and international laws. France was the first country to constitute the right to asylum. The right to asylum differs in different nations. There is a still fight for the right to asylum in some areas of the world.

In 2021, a French court ruled in an extradition hearing to avoid the deportation of a Bangladeshi man with asthma from France after his lawyer argued that he risked a severe deterioration in his condition, due to the air pollution in his homeland. Heavy floods affected Rohingya refugee camps in Bangladesh in July 2021.

The Biden administration in the United States released several intelligence agency reports in 2021 that sketched out in sweeping language the risks climate change poses to global stability. The reports emphasize the destabilizing effects climate change will take on developing countries including massive rises in food insecurity, worsening droughts, fires and flooding, and sea level rises. Some of the most vulnerable countries, the report concludes, are Guatemala, Haiti, Pakistan, Afghanistan, and Iraq; countries with weak state institutions that are located in especially climate-vulnerable regions of the world. In February of 2021, President Biden signed an executive order “directing the National Security Council to provide options for protecting and resettling people displaced by climate change”.

In an updated report on climate migration released in October of 2021, the Biden Administration detailed how the United States government should work to aid and assist climate migrants around the world. The report points to the use of U.S. foreign assistance through active humanitarian support, technical expertise, and capacity building and calls for increased funding to achieve these goals. Emphasizing the “complex interplay between climate change and migration”, the report orients the government’s focus to focus on climate migration as a single issue, demanding greater attention and focus in the coming years.

Perspective of countries taking immigrants 
In the UK, research is being done on how climate change's impact on countries that are emigrated to will vary due to the infrastructure of those countries. They want to put into place policies so that those who have to migrate could go throughout Europe, and have solid emergency planning in place so that the people being displaced would have a swift and quick plan of escape once their environment can no longer handle inhabitants-slow or sudden onset. The end goal of this work is to determine the best course of action in the event of various environmental catastrophes.

Planning for climate migrants 
Planning for climate migration, a subset of environmental migration, entails preparing for the desertion of geographically vulnerable areas as well as for the influx of vulnerable communities into largely  urban areas. In addressing current issues of environmental migration and preparing for forthcoming ones, experts call for interdisciplinary, locally-informed, equitable, and accessible approaches. Cities can explore what being “migrant friendly” might look like, such as offering job training programs, affordable and livable housing, access to green spaces, accessible mass transit systems, and resources to overcome language or cultural barriers. Special investment in both resources and information dissemination can help accommodate the diverse needs of people with disabilities and mental health conditions – both in the immediate moment of a disaster, where some emergency response and early warning systems may not be audiologically or visually accessible, and in the aftermath. Investments in flood barriers and other infrastructure for adaptation can provide physical protections against severe weather. Incorporating these considerations into planning conversations now can assist cities in preparing for the worst effects of climate change before some of the scenarios for climate migration come to occur.

Sustainable development, emergency response mechanisms, and local planning can help mitigate the consequences of climate migration. For people whose livelihoods are closely linked to the stability and health of their environment – like farmers and fishers – migration may become necessary for survival. A recent New York Times and Pulitzer Center article on the issue notes that “by comparison, Americans are richer, often much richer, and more insulated from the shocks of climate change. They are distanced from the food and water sources they depend on, and they are part of a culture that sees every problem as capable of being solved by money...Census data show us how Americans move: toward heat, toward coastlines, toward drought, regardless of evidence of increasing storms and flooding and other disasters...The sense that money and technology can overcome nature has emboldened Americans." This disparity is reflected in the coastal real estate market and development projects. Addressing climate migration issues and climate change as a whole may involve reimagining how, where, and why municipalities develop and urbanize for the future. 

In an article written for The Guardian, Gaia Vince outlined what the future of climate migration would look like and how countries can prepare. She cites research from the United Nations estimating that in the next 30 years, over 1 billion climate and environmental migrants will be uprooted from their homes, largely from countries in the Global South. Developed nations in North America and Europe, with aging and declining populations, will benefit from accepting and assimilating these climate migrants into their societies, she argues. Climate migration can be a solution to many of the world’s problems, rather than just a problem, according to Vince. Currently, there is no global body or organization devoted exclusively to the issue of climate migration, however, Vince argues that new climate-friendly policies are still possible. 

Vince points to the rapid European response to enact open-border policies and right-to-work laws for Ukrainian refugees fleeing the 2022 war as an example. The policies arguably saved millions of lives and enabled the migrants to avoid the convoluted and slow-acting bureaucratic hurdles that exist for migrants from other countries. Vince argues that the Ukrainian migrant policy provides a blueprint for how developed countries can adopt policies and contingency plans for climate migrants in the future.

Society and culture  
A documentary entitled Climate Refugees has been released in 2010. Climate Refugees was an Official Selection for the 2010 Sundance Film Festival. More recently, Short Documentary Academy Award Nominee, Sun Come Up (2011), tells the story of Carteret islanders in Papua New Guinea who are forced to leave their ancestral land in response to climate change and migrate to war-torn Bougainville. Since 2007, German artist Hermann Josef Hack has shown his World Climate Refugee Camp in the centers of various European cities. The model camp, made of roughly 1000 miniature tents, is a public art intervention that depicts the social impacts of climate change.

Various works of ecofiction and climate fiction have also featured migration. One of these is The Water Knife by Paolo Bacigalupi, which focuses on climate displacement and migration within the American Southwest. Another is the 2014 science fiction movie Interstellar.

See also 

 Effects of climate change on human health
 Managed retreat
 Space and survival

References

Further reading

External links
 Climate Change, Environment, and Migration Alliance
 World Refugee & Migration Council (2021) 'Solutions for the Global Governance of Climate Displacement'

Environmental issues
Refugees by type
Effects of climate change